is a train station in the city of Kurashiki, Okayama Prefecture, Japan.

The station was named after Kibi no Makibi, an 8th Century scholar and statesman from the region.

Lines
 Ibara Railway
 Ibara Line

Adjacent stations

|-
!colspan=5|Ibara Railway

Railway stations in Okayama Prefecture
Railway stations in Japan opened in 1999